Barbinae are a subfamily of fish included in the family Cyprinidae.  The taxonomy for this group has not been entirely worked out as some genera historically considered within it are still considered incertae sedis with respect to being a member of the family, and may be included here, while others may be moved to other subfamilies.

Genera
Genera normally included here:

 Acrossocheilus
 Aulopyge
 Balantiocheilos
 Barbus – typical barbels (and provisionally African barbs)
 Carasobarbus
 Clypeobarbus
 Dawkinsia
 Desmopuntius
 Diptychus
 Enteromius
 Haludaria
 †Hsianwenia
 Luciobarbus
 Mesopotamichthys
 Neobarynotus
 Oliotius
 Oreichthys
 Pethia
 Pseudobarbus
 Puntigrus
 Puntius
 Sahyadria
 Schizopyge
 Schizothorax
 Sinocyclocheilus
 Striuntius
 Systomus

References

Further reading

 Description of a new cyprinid fish of the subfamily Barbinae from China, GH Cui, ZY Li - Acta Zootaxonomica Sinica, 1984

 
Ray-finned fish subfamilies